Karpovshchina is a rural locality (a village) in Filippovskoye Rural Settlement, Kirzhachsky District, Vladimir Oblast, Russia. The population was 3 as of 2010. There is 1 street.

Geography 
Karpovshchina is located 30 km south of Kirzhach (the district's administrative centre) by road. Pesyane is the nearest rural locality.

References 

Rural localities in Kirzhachsky District